Hotel Bulgaria (Хотел България Бургас in Bulgarian) is a 4-stars business hotel and at 71 meters the 4th tallest building in Burgas, Bulgaria.

It is also the 27th highest building in Bulgaria.

The hotel is located in the historic city center and provides views at the Gulf of Burgas.

See also 
List of tallest buildings in Bulgaria

References

External links 
Homepage
Location on Google Maps.

Skyscrapers in Bulgaria
Hotels in Burgas